Rec 3: Genesis (stylised as [•REC]³: Génesis) is a 2012 Spanish action horror film directed and co-written by Paco Plaza. The film, which is the third installment in the Rec series, eschews the found-footage format of its predecessors as well as occurs at the same time as the first film. Rec 3: Genesis follows two newlyweds (played by Diego Martín and Leticia Dolera) who struggle to reunite with each other after the viral zombie outbreak ruins their wedding reception and infects their families. 

Rec 3: Genesis was released in Spain on 30 March 2012. with more international premiere dates that followed. The world premiere took place in Paris at the Grand Rex on 7 March, followed by midnight screenings at the South By Southwest Film Festival on 9 March. In the U.S., it was released via video on demand on 3 August and was released theatrically on 7 September 2012 in select cities. Sony Entertainment released the DVD on 6 November 2012. The film was followed by a fourth installment, Rec 4: Apocalypse, in October 2014.

Plot
Koldo and Clara are about to celebrate their wedding day and have gathered their friends and family in a sumptuous country house for the occasion. That evening, a veterinarian recently bitten by a dog develops abnormal behavior and becomes aggressive. In a few moments, an uncontrollable wave of violence sweeps over the party as an increasing number of guests are infected as a result of bites. Clara and Koldo are separated amidst the chaos. Koldo finds refuge in the kitchen with his cousin Adrián, Clara's sister Tita, the wedding photographer Atun and a copyright inspector nicknamed "Royalties". They escape through the air-conditioning ducts, apart from Atun due to his size. Outside, the group finds a police vehicle and a guest eating the policeman's flesh. After killing her, they try to contact the police, but Royalties is devoured by the now-infected policeman. The vehicle's sirens are triggered and alert the infected. The group escapes and joins other survivors within a chapel, which the infected cannot enter. Through the P.A. system, Koldo hears Clara say that she is safe as well as pregnant, and he decides to find her.

Clara and the wedding priest have found refuge in the video surveillance room and are helplessly watching the carnage unfold. Spotted by the infected, they escape and find Rafa, a friend of the couple, and Natalie, Clara's French friend who had retired to a room for sexual intercourse without realizing the situation. Clara, Rafa and Natalie flee while the priest immobilizes the infected by reciting a prayer. Meanwhile, Koldo arrives at the surveillance room and witnesses the massacre of Adrian, Tita, his grandmother, and others as they get cornered and eaten by the infected. Clara, Natalie and Rafa meet another survivor, children's entertainer "Sponge John". Natalie is bitten and Clara faces her infected mother. John shoots the mother before he himself is bitten. Clara and Rafa flee through a tunnel, but Clara turns around when she hears a song played by Koldo in the ballroom.

Clara, followed by Rafa, takes a chainsaw and fights her way through the infected, but Rafa is bitten and Clara is forced to kill him. Koldo enters the kitchen to find a dead Atun, having slit his wrists to prevent infection, and killing the Vet with a kitchen tool. Clara finds Koldo in the kitchen and both are surrounded by a horde of infected, which are suddenly paralyzed by the voice of the priest reciting scripture over the P.A. system. Clara and Koldo go out into the garden, but Clara is bitten by her infected grandfather, whose deafness renders him immune to the prayer. Koldo cuts Clara's arm just below the elbow to stop the infection, and they arrive at the estate's exit, where they discover that the authorities have quarantined the area. The attempt to stop Clara's infection fails, and she begins to show the first signs of infection; Koldo takes her outside where the police and a GEO team tell him to let her go. Clara and Koldo share a final kiss before Clara, now fully turned, bites his tongue off and then turns to attack the armed men, who shoot both of them down. In their final moments, Clara and Koldo hold each other's hands as they die of their wounds.

Cast

Production
The film began with the shooting on 4 April 2011 and ended on 20 May 2011. Post-production began on 23 May 2011. The shooting lasted for seven weeks in Barcelona. A teaser trailer premiered in September, while a theatrical trailer was released in December.

Release
REC 3: Génesis was released on 30 March 2012 in Spain. It was released on DVD in August 2012. The US release date was 3 August 2012 via On Demand services with a 7 September 2012 theatrical release date that followed. It was released on DVD in the US on 6 November 2012.

Reception
The film has received a broad range of reviews, mostly mixed to negative, due to the straying from the original two films' serious overtones. The review aggregator website Rotten Tomatoes gives the film a 40% with an average rating of 5.24/10, based on 47 reviews. The site's critics consensus reads, "[REC] 3 Genesis discards the handheld POV of its predecessors and loses the franchise's fresh perspective in the bargain, upping the gags and gore to the detriment of the chills that audiences crave." Metacritic.com gave the film 45 out of 100 with mixed reviews based on 11 critics.

At the New York Post, writer V. A. Musetto said the film was enjoyable to watch, giving it 4 out of 5 stars. It received a negative review from Slant Magazines Ed Gonzalez, who said that "if a fourth entry wasn't already in the works, [Rec] 3: Genesis could have easily represented the nail in the franchise's coffin."

Comic
A comic book compilation was released in 2012 to accompany the release of REC 3, titled REC: Historias Ineditas. The book presents five story arcs set in the REC series, illustrated by five artists.
 The first, ENCERRADOS (Trapped) follows the Teenagers trapped in the Apartment, following Tito's possession. They're released and taunted by Tito. Before they can escape however, they are shot down by a new group of GEO's who have come to rescue Angela.
 The second TRISTANA, provides the backstory for Tristana Medeiros, who becomes the possessed after being raped.
 The Third, ZOOMBII, deals with an infected man making his way to a Zoo, where he infects the animals.
 The fourth titled EL EXPERIMENTO (The Experiment), follows the priest, Padre Albelda, (the dead priest from the second film and the man heard on the voice recording at the end of the first installment) attempting to end the Medeiros Girl's life in the apartment.
 The Final Arc follows the Infected Uncle from the third film and reveals what happened to Max (the infected dog from the first film).

Sequel

A fourth film was released, titled REC 4: Apocalypse, with Manuela Velasco reprising her role as Ángela Vidal, the reporter from the first two films. In an interview to Fangoria, Jaume Balagueró stated that the film doesn't have an apocalyptic style presumed by its title, saying that "all of the movies in the [REC] series have the same budget, so you're not really going to see big scenes of Barcelona full of zombies; they're just not intended that way. There has to be a story that's controlled and strong". The film follows the events of the second film, and loses the "found-footage" style. Production began in 2013. At the 2012 Sitges Film Festival, it was announced the film would have its world premiere there in October 2013. An Announcement Trailer was released late November of the same year, confirming the return of Ángela Vidal.

However, on early May 2013, Balagueró, in an interview, revealed that the film's production had been delayed and the film would premiere sometime in mid-2014. A Teaser Poster and updated premise were released early May. Filming began early July 2013. In April 2014 a theatrical trailer was released and in late August 2014 the final trailer was released. The sequel was released on 31 October 2014.

References

External links
 
 
 
 
 
 

2012 films
2012 horror films
2010s supernatural horror films
2010s Catalan-language films
2010s French-language films
2010s Spanish-language films
Demons in film
Films about infectious diseases
Films about weddings
Films directed by Paco Plaza
Films set in Barcelona
Rec (film series)
Religious horror films
Spanish sequel films
Filmax films
Castelao Producciones films
2010s Spanish films
Spanish supernatural horror films
Spanish zombie films